Kahane Cooperman  is an American documentary filmmaker and television director and producer, whose 2016 documentary Joe's Violin was nominated for an Academy Award for Best Documentary Short Subject.

Early life 
Cooperman was born Kahane Rachel Corn, the daughter of Beatrice and Dr. David Corn. She is a graduate of Walt Whitman High School in Bethesda, Maryland.

Education 
Cooperman graduated with a B.A. in English from the University of Chicago and later a Masters of Fine Arts in film from Columbia University.

Career 

Her film Joe's Violin received a nomination for Best Documentary Short Subject at the 2017 Academy Awards. After its premiere at the Tribeca Film Festival and screenings worldwide, Joe's Violin had its broadcast premiere on the PBS series POV in July 2017, and can be seen online at NewYorker.com. Kahane has been directing and producing a feature documentary about kindness and decency in America at Radical Media. Prior, she executive produced seven short documentaries about autism, directing two of them, for Jon Stewart's Emmy-nominated Night of Too Many Stars on HBO. That same year, Kahane was the showrunner, executive producer, and a director of the four-hour non-fiction series Cold Blooded: The Clutter Family Murders with Joe Berlinger and Radical Media. The series had its broadcast premiere on SundanceTV in November 2017. Kahane was also the executive producer and showrunner of The New Yorker Presents, a series for Amazon with Alex Gibney's Jigsaw Productions, which premiered at the 2016 Sundance Film Festival. From 1996 to 2015, she was on the staff of The Daily Show with Jon Stewart, where she was originally hired as a field producer in 1996 and rose through the ranks to become Co-Executive Producer from 2005 to 2015. For her work at The Daily Show, she received eleven Primetime Emmy awards and three Peabody awards. Kahane was honored in 2017 by Variety as a Woman of Impact.

Kahane began her documentary career at the Maysles Films studios in New York City. Prior to Joe's Violin, she directed and produced several other documentaries including Cool Water, which premiered at the Sundance Film Festival, and Making Dazed, about Richard Linklater's Dazed and Confused, which was broadcast on AMC and acquired by the Criterion Collection. She also produced the feature documentary Heidi Fleiss: Hollywood Madam, directed by Nick Broomfield.

Personal life
In 1999, she married Jeffrey Cooperman at the Pratt Mansion in New York.

She has been a resident of Montclair, New Jersey.

References

External links
 Kahane Cooperman at Columbia University School of the Arts 
 

Living people
American producers
American directors
Columbia University School of the Arts alumni
Filmmakers from New Jersey
People from Montclair, New Jersey
University of Chicago alumni
Year of birth missing (living people)
Walt Whitman High School (Maryland) alumni